Lieutenant General Laurence Carr CB DSO OBE (14 April 188615 April 1954) was a British Army general during World War II.

Military career
Laurence Carr was commissioned into the Gordon Highlanders in 1904. He served in World War I in France and Belgium. After the War he attended the Staff College, Camberley and was deployed to India in 1920. From 1931 he was a General Staff Officer at the War Office moving on to join the staff at the Imperial Defence College in 1934. He was appointed Commander 2nd Infantry Brigade in 1936 and deployed to Palestine and then became Director of Staff Duties at the War Office in 1938.

He also served in World War II initially as Assistant Chief of the Imperial General Staff and then as General Officer Commanding I Corps, which formed part of the British Expeditionary Force, deployed to France and Belgium in 1940. He became General Officer Commanding-in-Chief of Eastern Command in 1941. His last appointment was as Senior Military Assistant to the Ministry of Supply in 1942; he retired in 1944.

Family
He was married to Elizabeth Montgomery Carr.

References

Bibliography

External links
Generals of World War II

|-
 

|-
 

1886 births
1954 deaths
Academics of the Staff College, Quetta
British Army lieutenant generals
British Army generals of World War II
British Army personnel of World War I
British military personnel of the 1936–1939 Arab revolt in Palestine
Companions of the Distinguished Service Order
Companions of the Order of the Bath
Graduates of the Royal Military College, Sandhurst
Graduates of the Staff College, Camberley
Officers of the Order of the British Empire
People educated at Uppingham School
War Office personnel in World War II